The 1986 Skate America was held at the Cumberland County Civic Center in Portland, Maine. Medals were awarded in the disciplines of men's singles, ladies' singles, pair skating, and ice dancing.

Results

Men

Ladies

Pairs

Ice dancing
CD1: Westminster Waltz 
CD2: Yankee Polka 
CD3: Rhumba

External links
 Skate Canada results
 Videos Sport / Lezin Videos - Men
 Videos Sport / Lezin Videos - Ladies
 Videos Sport / Lezin Videos - Pairs
 Videos Sport / Lezin Videos - Dance

Skate America, 1986
Skate America